Georgy Mikhailovich Beriev (Beriashvili) ( Georgij Michajlovič Beriev; Georgian: გიორგი მიხეილის ძე ბერიაშვილი Giorgi Mikheilis Dze Beriashvili; February 13, 1903 – July 12, 1979), was a Soviet Georgian major general, founder and chief designer of the Beriev Design Bureau in Taganrog, which concentrated on amphibious aircraft.

Biography

Beriev was born in Tbilisi in the Tiflis Governorate (present day Tbilisi, Georgia) of the Russian Empire. Of ethnic Georgian origin, his antecedents are uncertain, and it is not known when his family name was Russified from Beriashvili to Beriev. After graduating from the railway school in Tbilisi in 1923, he attended the School of Shipbuilding Engineering at the Leningrad Polytechnic Institute (now Saint Petersburg State Polytechnic University), and graduated with an engineering degree in 1930. He worked as an aircraft designer at the Central Design Office "WR Menzhinsky", where he developed the Beriev MBR-2 seaplane. From October 1934 to 1968, he ran the Central Design Office for marine aircraft in Taganrog, where he developed numerous successful, and often unique, amphibious aircraft designs.

In 1947 he was awarded the Stalin Prize for his work on the Be-6. He was also twice awarded the Order of Lenin and twice the Order of the Red Banner of Labour. In 1968, for the Be-12 (1968) design, he was awarded the USSR State Prize.

After retirement, he moved to Moscow and died in 1979.

Awards and honors
 Stalin Prize (1947)
 USSR State Prize (1968)
 Order of Lenin (1945, 1953)
 Order of the Red Banner of Labour (twice)

See also

 Alexander Kartveli
 Aleksandr Nadiradze
 Michael Gregor

References

External links
Official site in English
US division
Beriev Aircraft Corp. in the Taganrog Business Directory

1903 births
1979 deaths
Beriev
Engineers from Tbilisi
Communist Party of the Soviet Union members
Peter the Great St. Petersburg Polytechnic University alumni
Stalin Prize winners
Recipients of the Order of Lenin
Recipients of the Order of the Red Banner of Labour
Recipients of the USSR State Prize
Russian people of Georgian descent
Aircraft designers from Georgia (country)
Generals from Georgia (country)
Military personnel from Tbilisi
Soviet aerospace engineers
Soviet Georgian generals
Soviet major generals
Burials at Kuntsevo Cemetery